John Andrew Glover (born 10 October 1992) is an English cricketer.  Glover is a right-handed batsman who bowls right-arm medium-fast.  He was born at Shoreham-by-Sea, Sussex, and was educated at Hove Park School and Brighton Hove & Sussex Sixth Form College.

Having played for Sussex at various age-group levels, Glover made a single first-class appearance for Sussex against Oxford MCCU at the University Parks in 2011. In a match which ended as a draw, he wasn't required to bat in either of Sussex's innings, but did take a single wicket with the, that of Richard Coughtrie in Oxford MCCU's first-innings to finish with figures of 1/52 from fourteen overs. He had been a member of Sussex's cricket academy since 2010, the year in which he was the academy's player of the season.

References

External links
John Glover at ESPNcricinfo
John Glover at CricketArchive

1992 births
Living people
People from Shoreham-by-Sea
English cricketers
Sussex cricketers